XHPCHO-FM is a radio station on 92.7 FM in Guachochi, Chihuahua. It is known as La Patrona.

History
XHPCHO was awarded in the IFT-4 radio auction of 2017 alongside XHPGUA.

The stations began transmissions on September 11, 2017, with a formal inauguration on September 27 attended by Governor Javier Corral.

References

Radio stations in Chihuahua
Radio stations established in 2017
2017 establishments in Mexico